Under the Sun is a Swedish film which was released to cinemas in Sweden on 25 December 1998, directed by Colin Nutley, adapted from the short story The Little Farm by H. E. Bates. The film stars Rolf Lassgård, Helena Bergstrom (who is married to director Nutley), and Johan Widerberg. Set in Sweden in the mid-1950s, the film was nominated for the 1999 Academy Award for Best Foreign Language Film.

Plot
The film begins with a voice over quotation of the verse from the Book of Ecclesiastes which includes the language, "for every thing there is a season, and a time for every purpose under heaven".

After the death of his mother over a decade ago, Olof (Rolf Lassgård), an illiterate farmer, lives alone on his family farm. Olof can't read, so his young friend Erik (Johan Widerberg)—who has been a sailor and who claims to have known various American celebrities while staying in the United States of America and to have bedded hundreds of women—handles all the business of the farm. One day Olof puts out an ad for a woman in a local newspaper, asking applicants to include a photograph. The beautiful woman from outside of the village responds; Ellen (Helena Bergstrom).

As Ellen takes over more and more of the business of the farm, the farmer and the newcomer fall in love. Erik becomes convinced she is a gold-digger who is after Olof's money. Erik and Ellen quarrel, and Erik threatens to 'find out where you come from and who you are.' When he does find out that Ellen is married, he implies to Ellen that he will expose her.

Ellen leaves the farm, leaving behind a note to Olof in which she discloses that she is already married, and apologizes for having "betrayed his trust". She says she must go back and "sort things out" and closes by saying that she will always love Olof. Olof asks Erik to read the note to him. At first, Erik refuses. When he does read the note, he alters the text by inserting a sentence saying that Erik has repaid some money he borrowed from Olof, and that Ellen has taken the payments for herself. He also omits Ellen's declaration of eternal love for Olof.

Erik then announces he is going back to sea, on the SS Andrea Doria, and departs.
The ship that later the same year collided with M/S Stockholm and 49 people died.

Some time passes, and one day in the fall (the characters are wearing coats and Olof is bird hunting) when Olof is on a road, a passing car stops and from it steps Ellen. Olof has Ellen's note with him, and asks that she read it to him, confessing for the first time that he cannot read. Ellen reads the note, and asks if Olof wants her back.  The two are reunited and the film ends.

Cast 
 Rolf Lassgård as Olof
 Helena Bergström as Ellen Lind
 Johan Widerberg as Erik Jonsson
 Gunilla Röör as Newspaper Receptionist
 Jonas Falk as Preacher
 Linda Ulvaeus as Lena
  as Shop assistant
  as Undertaker

References

External links

Swedish romantic drama films
1990s Swedish-language films
1998 films
Films directed by Colin Nutley
Films set in 1956
1990s Swedish films